The following is a list of notable individuals associated with Sarah Lawrence College through attendance as a student, or service as a member of the faculty or staff.

Alumni

Entertainment and media 

Abiola Abrams, TV personality, writer and filmmaker
J. J. Abrams, Emmy Award-winning film and television producer, writer, actor, composer, and director
Jane Alexander, actress, author, and former director of the National Endowment for the Arts
Jon Avnet, film producer, director, and writer
Dylan Brody, playwright, author and stand-up comedian
Golden Brooks, actress
Yancy Butler, actress
Gabrielle Carteris, actress, best known for playing Andrea Zuckerman on Beverly Hills, 90210
Austin Chick, filmmaker, screenwriter and producer
Jill Clayburgh, Academy Award-nominated actress
Brian De Palma, film director
Cary Elwes, actor
Beverly Emmons, dance and Broadway lighting designer
Rachel Feldman, screenwriter and director
Tovah Feldshuh, actor
William Finley, actor
Carrie Fisher, actress, writer, comedienne, mental health advocate 
Robin Givens, actor
Adam Goldberg, actor
Lesley Gore, singer of the 1963 hit song "It's My Party".  Songwriter to the 1980 film Fame.  Actress appeared in the ABC TV series Batman portrayal of the character Pussycat (one of Catwoman's minions).  The 1965 film Girls On The Beach and Ski Party.  Made an appearance on the Teenage Awards Music International.
Janine Jackson, journalist and activist
Reo Jones, voice actor
Stacey Kent, jazz singer
Sarah Kernochan, writer, producer, and director
Téa Leoni, actress
David Lindsay-Abaire, Pulitzer Prize-winning playwright and screenwriter
Robert Lyons, playwright and director
Eric Mabius, actor
Consuelo Mack, business news journalist
Julianna Margulies, actress
Ivy Meeropol, film director
Larisa Oleynik, actress
Alice Pearce, actress
Jordan Peele, film director, actor, comedian
Holly Robinson Peete, actress
Sam Robards, actor
Amy Robinson, film producer and actress
Elisabeth Röhm, actress
Kyra Sedgwick, actress
Natalie Shaw, actress
Joan Micklin Silver, award-winning director
Sabiha Sumar, director
Aly Tadros, singer-songwriter
Misti Traya, actress
Guinevere Turner, actor, producer, and writer
James Veitch, comedian
Barbara Walters, television personality
Sigourney Weaver, actress
Merritt Wever, actress
Jeff Williams, actor
Joanne Woodward, actress /political activist

Music
Max Bemis, singer and songwriter for the band Say Anything
Win Butler, lead vocalist and songwriter for the band Arcade Fire
Alice Cohen, singer and songwriter
Margaret Fiedler, vocalist and multi-instrumentalist with Laika, Moonshake and PJ Harvey
Girlyman, folk-rock trio of Nate Borofsky, Ty Greenstein and Doris Muramatsu
Lesley Gore, singer and songwriter
Susie Ibarra, jazz composer and avant-garde musician
Diana Jones, singer-songwriter
Ira Kaplan, guitarist, vocalist, and songwriter of the band Yo La Tengo
Zoë Keating, composer and cellist from the band Rasputina
Stacey Kent, jazz vocalist
Josh Mancell, freelance composer and multi-instrumentalist
Rhett Miller, singer/songwriter and member of the band Old 97's
David Porter, TV composer for Breaking Bad
JD Samson, member of the band Le Tigre
Carly Simon, singer and songwriter
Joanna Simon, vocalist
Stewart Lupton, poet and singer-songwriter from the bands Jonathan Fire*Eater, the Childballads, and the Beatins' 
Dana Williams, singer-songwriter, guitarist, and poet.

Politics and public service
Brooke Anderson, diplomat; Deputy Ambassador to the UN; former chief-of-staff to the White House National Security Council; VP Communications, The Nuclear Threat Initiative
Lisa Anderson, scholar; President of the American University in Cairo, Egypt; former dean of Columbia University School of International and Public Affairs
Amanda Burden, director of the New York City Department of City Planning
Rahm Emanuel, mayor of Chicago; former White House Chief of Staff to President Barack Obama; former member of the U.S. House of Representatives, Fifth Congressional District of Illinois
Sharon Hom, director of Human Rights in China
Sue Kelly, U.S. House of Representatives, 19th Congressional District of New York
Clifford D. May, President of the Foundation for Defense of Democracies

Writing and poetics
 G. D. Baum, writer
 Melvin Jules Bukiet, novelist
 Carolyn Ferrell, writer
 Amanda Foreman, award-winning biographer
 Louise Gluck, winner of the Pulitzer Prize in poetry and former Poet Laureate of the United States
 Rebecca Godfrey, novelist
 Philip Graham, writer
 Lucy Grealy, writer
 Karl Taro Greenfeld, journalist and author
 David Grimm, playwright
 Allan Gurganus, writer
 Benjamin Hale, novelist
 Justin Haythe, novelist and screenwriter
 Kaui Hart Hemmings, writer
 A.M. Homes, writer
 Nancy Huston, Canadian author who writes primarily in French
 Porochista Khakpour, writer
 Carolyn Kizer, Pulitzer Prize-winning poet
 Christian Kracht, Swiss writer
Phillis Levin, poet
 Bennett Madison, writer
 Jeffrey McDaniel, poet
 Giulia Melucci, writer
 Brian Morton, novelist
 Sharyn November, editor
 Ann Patchett, author
 Anne Roiphe, novelist and essayist
 Esmeralda Santiago, Puerto Rican writer
 Alice Sheldon, who published science fiction as James Tiptree, Jr.
Leora Skolkin-Smith, novelist
 Alice Walker, winner of the Pulitzer Prize for her novel The Color Purple

Visual and performing arts
Janine Antoni, sculptor, installation artist
Ian Spencer Bell, choreographer
Mary Griggs Burke, largest private collector of Japanese art outside Japan
Lucinda Childs, postmodern dancer and choreographer, member of the Judson Dance Theater
Alexis de Chaunac, Contemporary artist
Jean Erdman, dancer and wife of Joseph Campbell
Mary Heilmann, painter, sculptor
Dan Hurlin, writer, choreographer, actor, puppet/object maker and puppeteer, winner of Obie and Alpert Awards
John Jasperse, choreographer, dancer, and artist
Linda McCartney, photographer; was married to musician Paul McCartney
Susan Meiselas, photographer and photojournalist, MacArthur Foundation Fellowship recipient
Meredith Monk, composer, singer and choreographer
Cady Noland, visual artist
Jedd Novatt, sculptor and painter
Yoko Ono, conceptual artist; was married to John Lennon
Maureen Paley, London art dealer
 Meridel Rubenstein, photographer and installation artist
Sonia Sekula, Swiss-American abstract-expressionist painter
Alice Louise Judd Simpich, sculptor
Holly Solomon, Soho art dealer
Alec Soth, photographer
Nancy Spector, chief curator of the Guggenheim Museum, NY
Ruth Carter Stevenson (1945), patron of the arts and founder of the Amon Carter Museum of American Art 
Vera Wang, fashion designer

Other notable alumni
Karen Adolph, psychologist and professor
Alice Brock, former restaurateur turned artist, title character of the song "Alice's Restaurant"
Nancy Cantor, Chancellor, Syracuse University
Hope Cooke, wife of 12th Chogyal (King) of Sikkim
Cornelia Fort, pioneer aviator who became the first female pilot to die on war duty in America history
Dr. Susan Houde-Walter, former president of the Optical Society of America, CEO of LaserMax Inc.
Ian Lipkin, Director of the Center for Infection & Immunity at the Mailman School of Public Health at Columbia University, authority on West Nile Virus
Jean Baker Miller, feminist, psychoanalyst, social activist
Lee Radziwill, actress, socialite, younger sister of Jacqueline Kennedy Onassis, and wife of Prince Stanisław Albrecht Radziwiłł
Elisabeth Young-Bruehl, academic and psychotherapist

Fictional alumni
Lloyd, of the HBO dramedy Entourage
Eric van der Woodsen, of the CW teen drama Gossip Girl
Karen Walker, of the sitcom Will & Grace
Kat Stratford, in the movie 10 Things I Hate About You
Allison "Allie" Hamilton, in the movie The Notebook
Jill Rosen, in the movie Baby It's You
Guinevere Turner, co-screenwriter of American Psycho, has a cameo in the film as one of the girls Patrick has in Paul's apartment. He asks if she wants to get it on with the other girl, and she says "I'm not a lesbian! Why would you think that?" Patrick replies "well, for one thing, you DID go to Sarah Lawrence"—the joke being that Turner is a lesbian, and she actually went to Sarah Lawrence.
Jenny Whiteman, of the movie Down and Out in Beverly Hills
 Mia Thermopolis, of Meg Cabot's Princess Diaries series
Hero Brown, a character in Brian K. Vaughan and Pia Guerra's Y: The Last Man comic book series
Marcia Jeffries from the 1957 film A Face in the Crowd studied music when she went east to Sarah Lawrence
Gil Chesterton from sitcom Frasier claims to be married to Deb, a "Sarah Lawrence graduate and the owner of a very successful auto body repair shop" (and an Army Reservist), whom his co-workers had believed to be merely a pet cat.
 Remy "Thirteen" Hadley of the Fox medical drama House
 "Sewage Joe" on the NBC sitcom Parks and Recreation is revealed to be an alumnus when he sends a lewd photograph to Ann from his alumni e-mail address.
 In J.D. Salinger's Franny and Zooey, a girl on a train is described as "absolutely... a Sarah Lawrence type... looked like she'd spent the whole train ride in the john, sculpting or painting or something, or as though she had a leotard on under her dress."
 In The Perks of Being a Wallflower, Charlie's older sister Candace has chosen to attend a “small liberal arts college back East called Sarah Lawrence.” 
 Parker Posey's character in Broken English
 Charles Boyle, of NBC's police sitcom Brooklyn Nine-Nine
Mary Andrews played by Molly Ringwald on Riverdale attended the show's fictional stand-in for the school, Sarah Florence.

Faculty

Current
Kirsten Agresta, harpist
 William Anderson, musician
 Colin Beavan, environmental activist and blogger
 Chester Biscardi, composer
 Melvin Jules Bukiet, novelist
 Jerrilynn Dodds, art historian, Guggenheim Fellow, Slade Professor of Art at Oxford
 Thomas Sayers Ellis, poet
 Beverly Emmons, dance and Broadway lighting designer
 Fawaz Gerges, Middle Eastern Affairs analyst for ABC news
 Mark Helias, musician
 Marie Howe, poet
 William Melvin Kelley, novelist and short story writer
 Eduardo Lago, novelist and winner of the Premio Nadal
 Tom Lux, poet
 Maria Negroni, poet
 Victoria Redel, poet, novelist, short fiction
 Vijay Seshadri, poet and essayist; winner of the 2014 Pulitzer Prize in Poetry
 Jacob Slichter, drummer for Semisonic
 Joel Sternfeld, photographer
 Malcolm Turvey, author, film historian, editor of October magazine
 Matilde Zimmermann, political activist and former U.S. presidential candidate

Former 
 Glenda Adams, novelist
 Léonie Adams, poet and former Poet Laureate of the United States and mentor to Louise Gluck
 Rudolf Arnheim
 Peter Cameron, novelist
 Joseph Campbell, cultural historian and critic of mythology
 Suzanne Chazin, novelist
 Billy Collins, poet and former Poet Laureate of the United States
 Dorothy DeLay, violin teacher at the Juilliard School
 Norman Dello Joio, Pulitzer Prize and Emmy Award-winning composer
 Stephen Dobyns, poet
 E.L. Doctorow, writer
 Mark Doty, poet and former Poet Laureate of the United States
 Cornelius Eady, poet
 Dana Gioia, poet
 Maria Goeppert-Mayer, Nobel Prize-winner in physics and one of only a few female winners of the prize
 Irving Goldman, anthropologist
 Paul Goodman, writer, anarchist, Gestalt Therapy contributor
 Martha Graham, dancer and choreographer
 Allan Gurganus, writer
 Kimiko Hahn, poet
 Randall Jarrell, poet and writer
 Mary Karr, poet and writer
 Randall Kenan, writer
 Galway Kinnell, poet
 Jane Kramer, Emmy Award-winning journalist
 Wilford Leach, Tony Award-winning director and screenwriter
 Max Lerner, journalist
 Tao Lin, writer
 Paul Lisicky, poet
 Helen Lynd, sociologist
 Valerie Martin, writer
 David Maslanka, composer
 Mary McCarthy, writer
 Donald McKayle, dancer and choreographer
 Grace Paley, poet, fiction writer, and political activist who in 2004 was awarded an honorary doctorate from Sarah Lawrence College
 Gilberto Perez, author, film historian
 Santha Rama Rau, writer
 Franklin Delano Roosevelt, III, economist
 Theodore Roszak, sculptor
 Muriel Rukeyser, poet and political activist who, while teaching at Sarah Lawrence, helped student Alice Walker publish her first works
 J.D. Salinger, writer
 Bessie Schonberg, dancer, choreographer and dance teacher, after whom the Bessie Awards were named.
 William Schuman, Pulitzer Prize-winning composer; former director of the Juilliard School; taught at Sarah Lawrence 1935-45
 Alan Shulman, composer and cellist
 David Smith, sculptor
 Susan Sontag, leftist intellectual, essayist, novelist, and activist
 Brooke Stevens, novelist
 Jean Valentine, National Book Award-winning poet
 Caroline F. Ware, New Deal activist
 Marguerite Yourcenar, writer

References

 
 
Sarah Lawrence College
People